Acalolepta kusamai is a species of beetle in the family Cerambycidae. It was described by Masao Hayashi in 1969. It is known from Japan.

References

Acalolepta
Beetles described in 1969